The Pahlavi dynasty was the last Iranian royal dynasty, ruling for almost 54 years between 1925 and 1979. The dynasty was founded by Reza Shah Pahlavi, a non-aristocratic Mazanderani soldier in modern times, who took on the name of the Pahlavi language spoken in the pre-Islamic Sasanian Empire in order to strengthen his nationalist credentials. 

The dynasty replaced the Qajar dynasty in 1925 after the 1921 coup d'état, beginning on 14 January 1921 when 42-year-old soldier Reza Khan was promoted by British General Edmund Ironside to lead the British-run Persian Cossack Brigade. About a month later, under British direction, Reza Khan's 3,000-4,000 strong detachment of the Cossack Brigade reached Tehran in what became known as the 1921 Persian coup d'état. The rest of the country was taken by 1923, and by October 1925 the Majlis agreed to depose and formally exile Ahmad Shah Qajar. The Majlis declared Reza Pahlavi as the new Shah of Iran on 12 December 1925, pursuant to the Persian Constitution of 1906. Initially, Pahlavi had planned to declare the country a republic, as his contemporary Atatürk had done in Turkey, but abandoned the idea in the face of British and clerical opposition.

The dynasty ruled Iran for 28 years as a form of constitutional monarchy from 1925 until 1953, and following the overthrow of the democratically elected prime minister, for a further 26 years as a more autocratic monarchy until the dynasty was itself overthrown in 1979.

Family background

In 1878, Reza Khan was born at the village of Alasht in Savadkuh County, Mazandaran Province. His parents were Abbas Ali Khan and Noushafarin Ayromlou. His mother was a Muslim immigrant from Georgia (then part of the Russian Empire), whose family had emigrated to mainland Qajar Iran after Iran was forced to cede all of its territories in the Caucasus following the Russo-Persian Wars several decades prior to Reza Shah's birth. His father was a Mazandarani, commissioned in the 7th Savadkuh Regiment, and served in the Anglo-Persian War in 1856.

Heads of House of Pahlavi

Consorts

Heirs 

The former constitution of Iran specifically provided that only a male who was not descended from Qajar dynasty could become the heir apparent. This made all half-brothers of Mohammad Reza ineligible to become heirs to the throne. Until his death in 1954, the Shah's only full brother Ali Reza was his heir presumptive.

The constitution also required the Shah to be of Iranian descent, meaning that his father and mother are Iranian.

Line of succession in February 1979 

  Reza Shah Pahlavi (1878–1944)
  Mohammad Reza Shah Pahlavi (1919–1980)
(1) Crown Prince Reza Pahlavi (b. 1960)
 Prince Ali-Reza Pahlavi (1966–2011)
 Prince Ali-Reza Pahlavi (1922–1954)
 (2) Prince Patrick Ali Pahlavi (b. 1947)
 (3) Prince Davoud Pahlavi (b. 1972)
 (4) Prince Houd Pahlavi (b. 1973)
 (5) Prince Mohammad Pahlavi (b. 1976)

List of crown princes

Royal jewels

Monuments

Use of titles

Shâh: Emperor, followed by Shâhanshâh of Iran, with style His Imperial Majesty
Shahbânu: Shahbânu or Empress, followed by first name, followed by "of Iran", with style Her Imperial Majesty
Valiahd: Crown Prince of Iran, with style His Imperial Highness
Younger sons: Prince (Shâhpūr, or King's Son), followed by first name and surname (Pahlavi), and style His Imperial Highness.
Daughters: Princess (Shâhdokht, or King's Daughter), followed by first name and surname (Pahlavi), and style Her Imperial Highness.
Children of the monarch's daughter/s use another version of Prince (Vâlâ Gohar, "of superior essence") or Princess (Vâlâ Gohari), which indicate descent in the second generation through the female line, and use the styles His Highness or Her Highness. This is then followed by first name and father's surname, whether he was royal or a commoner. However, the children by the last Shah's sister Fatemeh, who married an American businessman as her first husband, are surnamed Pahlavi Hillyer and do not use any titles.

See also

List of Shia dynasties
List of Muslim states and dynasties
Imperial Standards of Iran
Monarchism in Iran

References

External links